Homaloderodes germaini is a species of beetle in the family Carabidae, the only species in the genus Homaloderodes. It has been found in the Araucanía, Los Lagos, and Biobío regions of Chile.

References

Trechinae